Anna Wheeler may refer to:
 Anna Wheeler (author) (1780-1848), previously Anna Doyle, Anglo-Irish writer and supporter of women's rights
 Anna Johnson Pell Wheeler (1883-1966), American mathematician
 Anna Wheeler, Australian mother, and co-conspirator in the Xbox Underground hacks